Paraiso  (Filipino for "paradise") is an adventure story arc of the Philippine comic strip series Pugad Baboy, created by Pol Medina Jr. and originally published in the Philippine Daily Inquirer. This particular story arc lasts 54 strips long. In 2000, the story arc was reprinted in Pugad Baboy XII, the twelfth book compilation of the comic strip series.

Synopsis
Keeping a promise he had made more than five years previously, Dagul takes Debbie on a vacation to Club Paraiso in an island off Busuanga, Palawan. On their first night on vacation, Dagul discovers that Polgas had stowed away inside one of his travel bags. In the following days, the trio go snorkeling and scuba diving.

The first encounter
During one of these forays into the sea, Polgas notices dead fish floating past him. He soon discovers another diver squirting cyanide into the surrounding water. Polgas bites his arm and the cyanide fisherman, after losing the container of the poison, attacks Polgas with a knife. Polgas deflects the strike; consequently, the diver cuts off his air supply with his own knife. He swims for the surface with Polgas in hot pursuit. As they break the surface, Polgas hears the diver talking to another fisherman on a fishing vessel in Mandarin (which the reader actually sees rendered in Chinese characters. These lines loosely translate to, "Catch me if you can, even if you die trying"), and the second fisherman opens fire on Polgas. As Polgas dives to evade the gunfire,  lit stick of dynamite is thrown at him. As a consequence of the explosion, Polgas temporarily loses his hearing.

Polgas soon learns that mainland Chinese frequently entered and illegally fished Palawan waters using cyanide and dynamite. He decides to stop them upon seeing a whole fleet of Chinese fishing vessels operating off the Club Paraiso beaches. Using the satellite phone built into his garapata gun, Polgas calls Khalid, the former Muslim pirate he had befriended, and asks for the Red Marlin Group's help in stopping the illegal fishermen. He then calls OCB headquarters and requests that a special package be shipped to his current location. Needless to say, Polgas then assumes his Dobermaxx persona.

Engage!
Before leaving for Busuanga to retrieve his requested package, Dobermaxx deploys Gary, his tiny-tech fleabot, to provide him with updates in his absence. He then takes an inflatable boat powered by an outboard motor and threads his way through the fishing fleet. One of these, however, gives chase. A fishermen on board attempts to throw a lighted stick of dynamite at Dobermaxx, but a shot from the OCB agent's garapata gun causes him to drop the explosive. The pursuing fishing vessel blows up. Upon reaching Busuanga, Dobermaxx goes on horseback to the airport, intent on retrieving his special package. At the airport, Dobermaxx bark-activates the package, which is actually the Jet Jackal and flies back to Club Paraiso, but not before a security guard (who is a relative of Patrolman Durugas) tries to deny that such a shipment arrived.

Meanwhile, Dagul, Debbie and the rest of Club Paraiso's staff had taken refuge at Eagle's Point, the highest piece of terrain in the area. The Chinese fishermen, armed with assault rifles, attempt to storm the position, but Dagul and the rest fend them off with nothing more than thrown rocks. More attackers rush the group, but Dobermaxx hooks one of the fishing vessels using the Jet Jackal and drops it on the fishermen. One of the attackers managed to make it through the group's defense and rushes at them armed with a dao, but Dagul, using an Aikido technique, throws him off a cliff. Observing the fisherman's fall, Dagul himself fell off the cliff and into the sea. There, he decides to board the Chinese fishing vessels and do some damage. Using joss sticks as a primitive timer, he rigs each vessel's explosives to blow out in the open sea. At the sixth vessel, however, Dagul was caught by a sentry. As the sentry was about to shoot Dagul, Garapeater cannon fire from the Jet Jackal put him out of commission.

As the rigged vessels began to blow up one after the other, the bad guys came down from Eagle's Point to defend their boats. At this moment, 20 millimeter cannon fire began to rain down on the surviving vessels. It was the Red Marlin Group, now the Philippine Navy's special action group. As the Chinese fishermen ran out of ammunition, they began to adopt Kung Fu stances, apparently with no intent of surrendering. They did surrender, however, upon seeing the kris wielded by the Red Marlin. A few of the bad guys were able to escape in their fast motorized outrigger canoes, but the strong downdraft from the Jet Jackal's helium fusion engines caused these vessels to disintegrate.

After Dobermaxx lands the Jet Jackal, he and Khalid exchange good-natured ribbing. They had last seen each other five years ago, during the operation to destroy the biggest pirate ring in Basilan (as related in Pirata). After subduing the illegal fishermen, Khalid remarks that they were composed not just of Chinese, but Malaysians and other nationalities as well. Knowing that their respective governments would simply negotiate for their repatriation, Dobermaxx shoots them with his garapata gun. The victims began to itch and scratch.

Epilogue
By next morning, Khalid had taken the prisoners to the Bureau of Immigration and Deportation. Everyone sat down to a feast of the illegal fishermen's confiscated catch. As they began to dig in, Cathy, the resort's operations manager, thanked them for what they did; she however began to lecture the group about the damage done to the area's fragile ecosystem as a consequence of the battle. The other staff members, embarrassed with this outburst, hurriedly took her away.

Dagul attempted to keep a towel emblazoned with the resort's logo, but was prevented from doing so by Debbie. As they were about to leave, Dagul became annoyed with the farewell song being performed by one of the resort's staff, which was "Hindi Kita Malilimutan" by Basil Valdez (a common interment hymn in the Philippines).

He also checks his bag to see if Polgas had stowed away in it again, but Debbie remarks that Polgas is flying back with Dobermaxx in the Jet Jackal (in keeping with the premise that they do not know Polgas' secret identities, even though they obviously do).

References to popular culture and trivia
 The farewell number that so annoyed Dagul was the Basil Valdez song Hindi Kita Malilimutan (Filipino, "I Will Not Forget You"). The song is usually used in funerals and funeral processions (as Dagul points out).
 On the motorized bangka (outrigger canoe) trip from Busuanga to Club Paraiso, the boat's captain refer to Dagul and Debbie as "Jack and Rose" after the pair imitate Leonardo DiCaprio and Kate Winslet's intimate scene on the RMS Titanic's bow in the 1997 film Titanic.
 Several pop songs are mentioned in this story arc. Ain't No Mountain High Enough is referred to obliquely as being associated with a cellular phone company's advertising jingle. Raindrops Keep Fallin' on My Head is modified to "Rainrocks Keep Fallin' on My Head" as Dagul and the others throw rocks at their attackers. Marvin, the diving instructor, whistles the Mission: Impossible theme when Dagul was handed the tight-fitting wetsuit to be worn for the diving lessons.
 The Chinese poachers represents Chinese fishermen fishing on Philippine territory.
 The Sungcal couple will return later to Palawan, this time to promote Dagul's artwork, the Mang Dagul rice sculptures.
 The couple sits on same side of the plane, while the rest of the passengers are on opposite. The event was repeated during the Sungcal couple's return in Palawan.

Pugad Baboy